Argao, officially the Municipality of Argao,  is a 1st class municipality in the province of Cebu, Philippines. According to the 2020 census, it has a population of 78,187 people.

Geography
The municipality of Argao is located in the southeast of the province of Cebu,  from Cebu City.

Argao is bordered to the north by the municipality of Sibonga, to the west are the municipalities of Ronda, Alcantara  and Moalboal, to the east is the Cebu Strait, and to the south is the municipality of Dalaguete.

Barangays

Argao comprises 45 barangays:

Climate

Demographics

Economy

Tourism
The economy of the town of Argao heavily revolves around farming, baking, and tourism. Argao is renowned in Cebu as the "Torta Capital of the Province" because of its local delicacy, the Torta, a Cebuano tart that is inspired from the Spanish tart, but differs in its recipe by using tubâ or palm wine as the rising agent instead of the usual yeast. There are three Cebuano baking towns, the others are Liloan and Santander.

The La Torta Festival, which replaced the Pitlagong Festival in 2011, is the municipality's local food festival in honor of St Michael the Archangel, the patron saint of Argao. La Torta Festival happens every 28–29 September to celebrate Argao's Tart Economy and the torta as an Argaoanon delicacy, as well as cultural heritage from the Spanish period, which includes the tradition of making the torta.

Argao is also a producer of Cebuano tsokolate (chocolate). Much of the cocoa production originates from Argao. The raw cacao, once harvested, is molded, while melted, into disk-shaped tablets called tablea. These are often used in sikwate, a Cebuano version of hot chocolate. The production of chocolate in Argao is said to have been pre-colonial. Maria Cacao, a goddess of the Lantoy Mountain, is said to have been the giver of the cacao tree to the natives of Argao, according to legend. It is said that she and her husband Mangao reside in a cave in that area, surrounded by cacao trees.

Argao is, additionally, a producer of vinegar in the province. When the tubâ ferments or when it is aged too long, it becomes sour. It eventually turns into vinegar which is used as sauce or as component for a sauce in main courses. The palm vinegar is referred to as sukang tubâ. It is often accompanied with spices such as garlic and chili peppers and usually comes by the bottle.

See also

Philippine Science High School Central Visayas Campus

References

External links

Municipalities of Cebu